Ismael Londt (born 12 July 1985) is a Surinamese-Dutch kickboxer signed to the ONE Championship. 

He is the former SUPERKOMBAT Heavyweight Champion, and two time SUPERKOMBAT Grand Prix Heavyweight tournament winner.

He was ranked as a top ten heavyweight by Combat Press between December 2019 and January 2021. He was also ranked by Combat Press in the heavyweight top ten between May 2016 and May 2018.

Kickboxing career

SUPERKOMBAT
Londt participated in the 2011 SUPERKOMBAT Heavyweight Grand Prix II. In the semifinals, he knocked Sebastian Ciobanu out in the third round, with a left hook. In the finals, he fought Mladen Brestovac, and won by a first round TKO.

He took part in the 2011 SUPERKOMBAT Heavyweight World Grand Prix as well. He faced Pavel Zhuravlev in the semifinals. The fight went into an extra round, after which Londt won a split decision. He lost the final bout against Sergei Lascenko by a first round KO.

In 2012, he fought Freddy Kemayo for the SUPERKOMBAT Heavyweight title. Londt won a split decision.

He was scheduled to have his rubber match with Sergei Lascenko on 10 November 2012 in Craiova, Romania at the SUPERKOMBAT World Grand Prix 2012 Final Elimination, in the tournament. However, Lascenko was forced to pull out of the bout due to injuries sustained in his previous bout and replaced by Daniel Sam. Londt won by TKO in round one when the doctor stopped Sam from continuing due to a swollen eye.

He rematched Sebastian Ciobanu in the semi-finals at the SUPERKOMBAT World Grand Prix 2012 Final on 22 December in Bucharest, and won by TKO due to a cut in round two. In the final, he lost a unanimous decision to Pavel Zhuravlev after an extension round as he finished as runner-up for the second year in a row.

K-1
Londt faced Singh Jaideep at the K-1 World Grand Prix 2012 in Tokyo Final 16 on October 14 and won via majority decision.

At the K-1 World Grand Prix 2012 Final on 15 March 2013 in Zagreb, Croatia, he faced Hesdy Gerges in the quarter-finals and won by TKO in round three after breaking Gerges' nose with a flying knee. In the semis, he went up against Dževad Poturak, who was filling in for an injured Badr Hari, and won by another knee TKO when he broke Poturak's rib in round two. He lost to Mirko Cro Cop in the tournament final, dropped with a left high kick in round two before losing a unanimous decision. 

Some controversy later emerged, as Londt, and the rest of the Grand Prix participants would never receive their compensation. K-1 was supposed to pay Londt €300 000.

He lost to Benjamin Adegbuyi by unanimous decision at Slamm!! Soema Na Basi IV in Paramaribo, Suriname on 8 August 2013. He was expected to fight Badr Hari at the A1 World Combat Cup in Eindhoven, Netherlands on 17 May 2014. The fight was cancelled.

He was expected to defend his SUPERKOMBAT Heavyweight Title against Cătălin Moroșanu at the SUPERKOMBAT World Grand Prix IV 2014 in Almere, Netherlands on 27 September 2014. However, he pulled out once again this time due to undisclosed reasons.

Glory
He was signed for Glory 29: Copenhagen in February 2016.

Londt was immediately placed in the 2016 Glory Heavyweight Contender tournament. He won a majority decision against Anderson Silva in the semifinals, and won a split decision against Jahfarr Wilnis in the finals.

Londt next fought a rematch with Hesdy Gerges during Glory 31: Amsterdam. Both fighters were deducted a point for excessive clinching in the third round. Londt would go on to win a split decision.

Ismale Londt fought Jamal Ben Saddik during Glory: Collision. Ben Saddik won a unanimous decision. Londt lost his next fight with Glory as well, losing a unanimous decision to D'Angelo Marshall.

Moving away from Glory, Londt fought in the 2017 Mix Fight Heavyweight tournament. He defeated Enver Sljivar by KO in the semifinals, and James McSweeney by TKO in the finals.

ONE Championship
In May 2020, Londt signed a contract with ONE Championship. He was booked to make his promotional debut against the 2018 Kunlun Fight Heavyweight tournament winner Iraj Azizpour at ONE: Lights Out on March 11, 2022. After coming out strong in the first round, Londt lost the fight by second-round knockout.

Titles
2019 Mix Fight Heavyweight Tournament Winner
2016 Glory Heavyweight Contender Tournament Winner
First SUPERKOMBAT Heavyweight Champion
2012 K-1 World Grand Prix Runner-up
2012 SUPERKOMBAT World Grand Prix Runner-up
2012 SUPERKOMBAT Heavyweight Champion 
2011 SUPERKOMBAT World Grand Prix Runner-up
2011 SUPERKOMBAT World Grand Prix II Champion
2010 IPTA K-1 Rules World Champion +95 kg

Kickboxing record (Incomplete)

|-  bgcolor="#FFBBBB"
| 2022-03-11|| Loss ||align=left| Iraj Azizpour || ONE: Lights Out || Kallang, Singapore || KO (Punches) || 2 || 2:01 || 
|-
|-  bgcolor="#CCFFCC"
| 2019-12-07 || Win ||align=left| James McSweeney || Mix Fight 27 Heavyweight Tournament, Final || Frankfurt, Germany || TKO (Doctor stoppage) || 1 || N/A
|-  bgcolor="#CCFFCC"
| 2019-12-07 || Win ||align=left| Enver Sljivar || Mix Fight 27 Heavyweight Tournament, Semi Final || Frankfurt, Germany || KO (Right punch) || 1 || N/A
|-
|-  bgcolor="#FFBBBB"
| 2017-12-09 || Loss ||align=left| D'Angelo Marshall || Glory 49: Rotterdam || Rotterdam, Netherlands || Decision (Unanimous) || 3 || 3:00
|-
|-  bgcolor="#FFBBBB"
| 2016-12-10 || Loss ||align=left| Jamal Ben Saddik || Glory: Collision || Oberhausen, Germany || Decision (Unanimous) || 3 || 3:00
|-
|-  bgcolor="CCFFCC"
| 2016-06-25 || Win ||align=left| Hesdy Gerges || Glory 31: Amsterdam || Amsterdam, Netherlands || Decision (Split) || 3 || 3:00
|-
|-  bgcolor="CCFFCC"
| 2016-04-16 || Win ||align=left| Jahfarr Wilnis || Glory 29: Copenhagen - Heavyweight Contender Tournament, Final || Copenhagen, Denmark || Decision (Split) || 3 || 3:00
|-
! style=background:white colspan=9 |
|-
|-  bgcolor="CCFFCC"
| 2016-04-16 || Win ||align=left| Anderson Silva || Glory 29: Copenhagen - Heavyweight Contender Tournament, Semi Finals || Copenhagen, Denmark || Decision (Majority) || 3 || 3:00
|-
|-  bgcolor="#FFBBBB"
| 2015-08-22 || Loss ||align=left| Badr Hari || Akhmat Fight Show || Grozny, Russia || TKO (Straight right) || 3 || 0:42
|-
|-  bgcolor="CCFFCC"
| 2015-05-16 || Win ||align=left| Rustemi Kreshnik || A1 World Combat Cup || Eindhoven, Netherlands || TKO (Referee stoppage) || 1 || N/A
|-
|-  bgcolor="#CCFFCC"
| 2015-04-19 || Win ||align=left| Michal Janáček || The Best of all Elements|| Almere, Netherlands || TKO (Right high kick) || 2 || N/A
|-
|-  bgcolor="#CCFFCC"
| 2015-03-21 || Win ||align=left| Giga Kukhalashvili || A1 World Combat Cup || Tbilisi, Georgia || KO (Flying knee)|| 1 || 00:24
|-
|-  bgcolor="#CCFFCC"
| 2013-09-28 || Win ||align=left| Sebastien van Thielen || A1 World Combat Cup: Event of the Year || Eindhoven, Netherlands || Decision (Unanimous) || 3 || 3:00
|-
|-  bgcolor="#FFBBBB"
| 2013-08-08 || Loss||align=left| Benjamin Adegbuyi || Slamm!! Soema Na Basi IV || Paramaribo, Suriname ||Decision (Unanimous) || 3 || 3:00
|-
|-  bgcolor="#FFBBBB"
| 2013-03-15 || Loss ||align=left| Mirko Cro Cop || K-1 World Grand Prix 2012 Final, Final || Zagreb, Croatia || Decision (Unanimous) || 3 || 3:00
|-
! style=background:white colspan=9 |
|-
|-  bgcolor="#CCFFCC"
| 2013-03-15 || Win ||align=left| Dževad Poturak || K-1 World Grand Prix 2012 Final, Semi Finals || Zagreb, Croatia || TKO (Broken rib) || 2 || 1:25
|-  bgcolor="#CCFFCC"
| 2013-03-15 || Win ||align=left| Hesdy Gerges || K-1 World Grand Prix 2012 Final, Quarter Finals || Zagreb, Croatia || TKO (Broken nose) || 3 || 1:42
|-  bgcolor="#FFBBBB"
| 2012-12-22 || Lose ||align=left| Pavel Zhuravlev || SUPERKOMBAT World Grand Prix 2012 Final, Final || Bucharest, Romania || Decision (Unanimous) || 4 || 3:00
|-
! style=background:white colspan=9 |
|-
|-  bgcolor="#CCFFCC"
| 2012-12-22 || Win ||align=left| Sebastian Ciobanu || SUPERKOMBAT World Grand Prix 2012 Final, Semi Finals || Bucharest, Romania || TKO (Doctor stoppage) || 2 || N/A
|-  bgcolor="#CCFFCC"
| 2012-11-10 || Win ||align=left| Daniel Sam || SUPERKOMBAT World Grand Prix 2012 Final Eliminatiom, Quarter Finals || Craiova, Romania || TKO (Doctor stoppage/Eye injury) || 1 || N/A
|-  bgcolor="#CCFFCC"
| 2012-10-14 || Win ||align=left| Singh Jaideep || K-1 World Grand Prix 2012 in Tokyo Final 16, First Round || Tokyo, Japan || Decision (Majority) || 3 || 3:00
|-  bgcolor="#CCFFCC"
| 2012-07-07 || Win ||align=left| Freddy Kemayo || SUPERKOMBAT World Grand Prix III 2012 || Varna, Bulgaria || Decision (Split) || 3 || 3:00
|-
! style=background:white colspan=9 |
|-
|-  bgcolor="#CCFFCC"
| 2012-02-25 || Win ||align=left| Vladimir Toktasynov || SUPERKOMBAT World Grand Prix I 2012 || Podgorica, Montenegro || TKO (Referee stoppage) || 1 || 0:48
|-
|-  bgcolor="#FFBBBB"
| 2011-11-19 || Loss ||align=left| Sergei Lascenko || SUPERKOMBAT World Grand Prix 2011 Final, Final || Darmstadt, Germany || KO (Punches) || 1 || 2:04
|-
! style=background:white colspan=9 |
|-
|-  bgcolor="#CCFFCC"
| 2011-11-19 || Win ||align=left| Pavel Zhuravlev || SUPERKOMBAT World Grand Prix 2011 Final, Semi Finals || Darmstadt, Germany || Ext R. Decision (Split) || 4 || 3:00
|-  bgcolor="#CCFFCC"
| 2011-10-23 || Win ||align=left| Mourad Bouzidi || Muay Thai Mania 4 || Rijswijk, Netherlands || KO (Uppercut) || 2 || N/A
|-  bgcolor="#CCFFCC"
| 2011-08-26 || Win ||align=left| Reamon Welboren || SLAMM! Events: Super Suri Thaiboxing Cup || Paramaribo, Suriname || Decision || N/A || N/A
|-  bgcolor="#CCFFCC"
| 2011-07-16 || Win ||align=left| Mladen Brestovac || SUPERKOMBAT World Grand Prix II 2011, Final || Constanța, Romania || TKO (Referee stoppage) || 1 || 0:55
|-
! style=background:white colspan=9 |
|-  bgcolor="#CCFFCC"
| 2011-07-16 || Win ||align=left| Sebastian Ciobanu || SUPERKOMBAT World Grand Prix II 2011, Semi Finals || Constanța, Romania || KO (Left hook) || 3 || 0:37
|-  bgcolor="#CCFFCC"
| 2011-06-30 || Win ||align=left| Tomas Hron || N/A || Prague, Czech Republic || Decision (Unaniomus) || 3 || 3:00
|-  bgcolor="#CCFFCC"
| 2011-06-05 || Win ||align=left| Vladimir Toktasynov || Memento Mori II  || Rotterdam, Netherlands || KO || 1 || N/A
|-  bgcolor="#CCFFCC"
| 2010-12-23 || Win ||align=left| Roger Pinas || Klaar om te Bosse || Paramaribo, Suriname || KO || N/A || N/A
|-  bgcolor="#CCFFCC"
| 2010-12-04 || Win ||align=left| Alex Rossi ||Janus Fight Night 2010 || Padua, Italia || KO || 2 || N/A
|-  bgcolor="#CCFFCC"
| 2010-10-20 || Win ||align=left| Sergei Lascenko || Tatneft Arena World Cup 2010 final (+91 kg) || Kazan, Russia || Decision (Unanimous) || 3 || 3:00
|-  bgcolor="#CCFFCC"
| 2010-09-05 || Win ||align=left| Asmir Burgic ||Human's Fight Night IV || Hamburg, Germany || KO || 3 || N/A
|-
! style=background:white colspan=9 |
|-
|-  bgcolor="#CCFFCC"
| 2010-05-13 || Win ||align=left| Tsotne Rogava || Tatneft Arena World Cup 2010 2nd selection 1/4 final (+91 kg) || Kazan, Russia || Ext R. Decision (Unanimous) || 4 || 3:00
|-  bgcolor="#FFBBBB"
| 2010-05-08 || Loss ||align=left| Henriques Zowa || Fight Masters || Almere, Netherlands || TKO || N/A || N/A
|-  bgcolor="#CCFFCC"
| 2010-04-10 || Win ||align=left| Patrick Schmitt || Almere's Finest || Almere, Netherlands || TKO || 1 || N/A
|-  bgcolor="#c5d2ea"
| 2010-03-21 || Draw ||align=left| Goran Radonjic || K-1 World MAX 2010 West Europe Tournament || Utrecht, Netherlands || Draw || 3 || 3:00
|-  bgcolor="#CCFFCC"
| 2010-02-10 || Win ||align=left| Todor Todorov || Tatneft Arena World Cup 2010 3rd selection 1/8 final (+91 kg) || Kazan, Russia || KO || 1 || 2:30
|-  bgcolor="#CCFFCC"
| 2009-12-23 || Win ||align=left| Jan Siersema || Slamm!! in Suriname "The Return Fighters presents Klaar om te Bossen" || Paramaribo, Suriname || KO || 1 || N/A
|-  bgcolor="#CCFFCC"
| 2009-11-29 || Win ||align=left| Brian Douwes || SLAMM "Nederland vs Thailand VI" || Almere, Netherlands || Decision (Unanimous) || 5 || 3:00
|-  bgcolor="#CCFFCC"
| 2009-06-13 || Win ||align=left| Rico Verhoeven || Gentlemen Promotions || Tilburg, Netherlands || Decision (Unanimous) || 3 || 3:00
|-  bgcolor="#CCFFCC"
| 2009-05-09 || Win ||align=left| Frank Muñoz|| SLAMM Catalonia vs Netherlands || Barcelona, Spain || Decision || 3 || 3:00
|-  bgcolor="#FFBBBB"
| 2009-01-29 || Loss ||align=left| Nicolas Wamba || Champions League, Semi Finals || Lisbon, Portugal || Decision (Split) || 3 || 3:00
|-  bgcolor="#CCFFCC" 
| 2008-05-18 || Win ||align=left| Yassin Bensalem || Masters of the Ring, Zonnehuis || Amsterdam, Netherlands || Decision (Unanimous) || 3 || 2:00
|-
| colspan=9 | Legend:

See also
List of K-1 events
SLAMM!! Events
List of male kickboxers

References

1986 births
Living people
Dutch male kickboxers
Surinamese male kickboxers
Heavyweight kickboxers
Dutch Muay Thai practitioners
Surinamese Muay Thai practitioners
Dutch sportspeople of Surinamese descent
Sportspeople from Rotterdam
Glory kickboxers
SUPERKOMBAT kickboxers
ONE Championship kickboxers